This list comprises all players who have participated in at least one league match for Whitecaps FC 2 since the team's first USL season in 2015.

A "†" denotes players who only appeared in a single match.

A
 Sam Adekugbe

B
 Jovan Blagojevic
 Victor Blasco
 Marco Bustos

C
 Terran Campbell †
 Marco Carducci
 Ian Christianson
 Kadin Chung
 Caleb Clarke

D
 Christian Dean

E
 Robert Earnshaw

F
 Jackson Farmer
 Deybi Flores
 Kianz Froese

G
 Thomas Gardner

H
 Jordan Haynes
 Erik Hurtado

L
 Brett Levis
 Andre Lewis

M
 Ben McKendry
 Nicolás Mezquida †

N
 Craig Nitti

P
 Tim Parker
 Mitch Piraux
 Mackenzie Pridham

R
 Spencer Richey
 Diego Rodríguez
 Tyler Rosenlund

S
 Ethen Sampson
 Sahil Sandhu
 Billy Schuler
 Chris Serban
 Will Seymore

T
 Paolo Tornaghi

W
 Deklan Wynne

External links

Whitecaps FC 2
 
Association football player non-biographical articles